Deepavali is a 2007 Indian Tamil-language action romance film written and directed by Ezhil and produced by Thirupathi Brothers. Starring Jayam Ravi and Bhavana in lead and Raghuvaran, Lal, and Vijayakumar in supporting roles. The shooting of the film finished in December 2006, with shooting locations were canned in India and in Oman, for the picturization of a song. The film released worldwide on 9 February 2007 to positive reviews.

It has also been remade into Oriya in 2010 as Dil Tate Deichi and in Bengali in 2013 as Deewana.

Plot
Billu is the son of Mudaliar. Mudaliar is much loved and respected by the people of his locality, and Billu is almost like a foster son to every person in the locality.

Billu takes an instant liking for Susi the moment he sets his eyes on her at the railway station. Susi, who has arrived from Bangalore to Chennai, is all set to stay at Settu's place. Settu, who has worked for Susi's father Chidambaram, a dreaded thug, earlier, has changed ways, but retains his respect towards him nevertheless. Susi, who has been craving for love and concern since young, gets impressed with the bonding that the Royapuram residents share. When a Godman predicts Susi is the one for Billu, and she is taken aback. She dreads her father to a great extent and fears that things will go topsy-turvy if their relationship blossoms into love. But soon, she realizes she cannot camouflage her feelings towards Billu and enjoys being in the company of Billu and his friends, when the unexpected occurs.

Susi acts peculiar when a long-lost friend meets her at a restaurant. She denies knowing her, despite her friend Revathi's attempts to talk to her. Feeling insulted, Revathi walks away, much to the dismay and confusion of Billu and his friends. Susi, who gets emotionally high-strung, leaves the restaurant in a jiffy too. Susi, at this juncture, comes out with the truth to Billu. Affected with PTSD after an accident, Susi has forgotten events that happened in a span of three years. Billu, who takes her to the doctor Devasaghayam, learns that this condition can be cured, but when she does get cured, Susi will not be in a position to remember whatever happened and whoever she met at Chennai - Billu included.

This disheartens Susi to a major extent, and she persuades Billu to promise her that he would never leave her, even if she were to forget him due to her condition. Billu promises her that he would never leave her, come whatever may. Billu's conversation with Chidambaram infuriates the latter, and he immediately arrives in Chennai with his goons. When he is all set to leave for Bangalore with his daughter, the residents rise to the occasion and flock against Chidambaram. Deciding to play it safe, Chidambaram agrees to the engagement between Billu and Susi, and cunningly, thrashes Billu after making him arrive at a place far from his locality, at the outskirts. The helpless Susi travels along with her father, escorted by his men, to Bangalore.

When Billu meets Susi at her residence, he gets nothing less than shocked as she has been cured, and she fails to recognize him. But Billu, who had given the word to his beloved that he would never leave her, is not the one to relent. At the end,he tries relentlessly to convince her and finally, her memories were rekindled and she was remembered of Billu and joins with him.

Cast

Soundtrack

The music of Deepavali was scored by Yuvan Shankar Raja, who got to work together with director S. Ezhil for the first time. The soundtrack was released on 5 January 2007, which features 5 tracks with lyrics written by Na. Muthukumar, Yugabharathi and Kabilan. The album was a major success as the songs got immensely popular upon release, particularly the songs "Pogadhey" and "Kadhal Vaithu".

References

External links
 

2007 films
Indian romantic action films
Films set in India
Tamil films remade in other languages
2000s Tamil-language films
Films directed by Ezhil
2000s romantic action films
Films shot in Bangalore
Films shot in Oman